The MP34 (Maschinenpistole 34, literally "Machine Pistol 34") is a submachine gun (SMG) that was manufactured by Waffenfabrik Steyr as Steyr-Solothurn S1-100 and used by the Austrian Army and Austrian Gendarmerie and subsequently by units of the German Army and the Waffen SS, in World War II. An exceptionally well-made weapon, it was used by some forces well into the 1970s.

History
The MP 34 was based on a design for the MP 19 by the Rheinmetall company based in Düsseldorf. The weapon is similar in design to the MP 18 Bergmann, which itself saw service towards the end of World War I.

Restrictions on the manufacture of certain armaments within the 1919 Treaty of Versailles forbade Germany from manufacturing certain types of weapons, such as light automatic firearms (designated as SMGs with barrels in excess of four inches (102 mm)  and magazines holding more than eight rounds). To circumvent the treaty, Rheinmetall acquired the Swiss company Waffenfabrik Solothurn in 1929 and began secret production of a prototype. What was to become the MP 34 was originally designated ‘S1-100’ using the company's standard naming convention.

Due to the Solothurn company being unsuited for mass production, Rheinmetall took a controlling interest in Waffenfabrik Steyr, an established arms manufacturer in Austria. Weapons manufactured by Steyr were sold via the Zurich-based trade company Steyr-Solothurn Waffen AG to  both the commercial and military markets.

The MP 34 was manufactured from the very best materials available and finished to the highest possible standard. It was so well manufactured that it has often been nicknamed the "Rolls-Royce of submachine guns". However, its production costs were extremely high as a consequence.

Operation

The MP34 was a selective-fire weapon (single shot or full auto), firing in blowback mode with an open bolt. The return spring was located in the wooden stock and was linked to the bolt via a long push rod, attached via a pivot to the rear of the bolt. Easy access to the bolt and trigger assembly was via a hinged top cover which opened up and forward by depressing two release catches. This makes cleaning procedures very easy to perform.

On the left-hand side of the stock was a sliding fire selector switch (marked by letters T and S). Initial production runs of the gun had a Schmeisser-style bolt-locking safety (similar to the MP40) in the form of hook-shaped cut which was used to engage the bolt handle when the bolt was cocked (which was notoriously unsafe). Later models included a manual safety on the top cover, just in front of the rear sight. This safety could lock the weapon in both a cocked or closed position.

32- or 20-round box magazines were fed in from the left side and the magazine housing was angled slightly forward to improve cartridge feeding to prevent jams. Additionally, the same magazine housing incorporated a magazine refilling feature. An empty magazine could be inserted from underneath and locked in place. From above stripper clips (of 8 rounds each) could be fed into the magazines.

All MP34s were equipped with a wooden stock with a semi-pistol grip. The barrel was enclosed into a perforated cooling jacket, and had a bayonet-fixing lug on the right-hand side. Front (hooded) and rear rifle-type sights were fitted – the latter marked from 100 to 500 meters.

Some versions of the weapon could be fitted with a detachable tripod for use as a machine gun.

Service
In 1930, the Austrian police accepted the S1-100 as the Steyr MP30, chambered for then standard Austrian 9×23mm Steyr pistol rounds. The guns sold to South America, China and Japan were in 7.63x25 Mauser calibre.

The Austrian Army adopted the Steyr-Solothurn S1-100 as the Steyr MP34, chambered for the powerful 9×25mm Mauser ammunition.

With the 1938 Anschluss between Germany and Austria, the German Army acquired most of the available MP30s and MP34s. A number were then re-barrelled to chamber 9×19 ammunition and issued to German troops as the MP34(ö) – Maschinenpistole 34 österreichisch (literally "Machine-pistol 34, Austrian"). Production of the MP34 ceased in mid-1940, and manufacturing lines at Steyr moved over to the production of the MP40 – a much simpler designed weapon and far less expensive to produce than the MP34. As a substitute standard small arm, it had a relatively short combat service once quantities of the MP38 became available, though some MP34s were used by Waffen SS units in the early stages of the war in Poland and France. It was then allocated to security and reserve units, including military police and Feldgendarmerie detachments.

In Greece, various police forces under the Ministry of Security, notably the mechanized police, were equipped with the S1-100 in 9×25mm Mauser caliber. In Yugoslavia, both the Partisans and the Chetniks used captured Solothurn MP34s carried by German and Croatian troops.

Portugal bought in small quantities the .45 ACP version and was adopted as Pistola-metralhadora 11,43mm m/935. Portugal also purchased small quantities of the S1-100 in 7.65x21mm Luger calibre in 1938, and the weapon was adopted as the Pistola-metralhadora 7,65 mm m/938 Steyer submachine gun. In 1941 and 1942, larger numbers of 9mm MP34 guns were delivered to Portugal by Germany. In Portuguese service, the 9mm MP34 was known as the Pistola-metralhadora 9 mm m/942 Steyer.<ref>Abbott, Peter and Rodrigues, Manuel, Modern African Wars 2: Angola and Mozambique 1961–74, Osprey Publishing (1998), p. 17</ref>  Many m/942 guns carry a Portuguese crest just forward of the safety mechanism in combination with Waffenamt (WaA) markings. The m/942 remained in service with Portuguese Army into the 1950s, and was used until the 1970s by paramilitary and security forces in Portugal's overseas African colonies during the Portuguese Colonial Wars.

During the late 1930s, Japan imported a small number of MP 34s for testing and limited issue.

Users

 
 
  - Adopted by Bahia police; in 1938 one was borrowed by the Alagoas police and used in the raid that killed Lampião
 - A small number was acquired for police units in the 1930s; used in larger numbers during WWII 
 
 
  - Used by police and gendarmerie forces
 
 
 
 
  Italian Partisans - Used examples captured from German soldiers
 

 

 
 
 
 
  Yugoslav Partisans and Chetniks
 

References
 Notes 

 Bibliography 
 Ezell, Edward Clinto. Small Arms Of The World, Eleventh Edition, Arms & Armour Press, London, 1977
 Gotz, Hans Dieter, German Military Rifles and Machine Pistols, 1871–1945. West Chester, Penn.: Schiffer Publishing, 1990. .
 Günter Wollert; Reiner Lidschun; Wilfried Kopenhagen, Illustrierte Enzyklopädie der Schützenwaffen aus aller Welt: Schützenwaffen heute (1945–1985), Berlin: Militärverlag der Deutschen Demokratischen Republik, 1988. .
 Moss, John L., "The 9×25 Mauser Export Cartridge", IAA Journal, issue 424, March/April 2002, pp. 6–20
 Schweizer Waffen Magazin Internationales Waffen Magazine German Small Arms'' (1971)

External links
 Japanese Contract Steyr-Solothurn S1-100 (aka MP34)
 Subguns for South America: the Steyr-Solothurn MP-34 in .45ACP

9×25mm Mauser submachine guns
9mm Parabellum submachine guns
Submachine guns of Austria
World War II infantry weapons of Germany
World War II submachine guns
Military equipment introduced in the 1920s